The Walls of Jericho is a 1914 American silent drama film directed by Lloyd B. Carleton and James K. Hackett. It starring Edmund Breese, Claire Whitney, Walter Hitchcock, Stuart Holmes, and Edward José. It is based on the 1906 play The Walls of Jericho by Alfred Sutro. The film was released by Box Office Attractions Company on November 19, 1914.

Plot
In London, Lady Althea Frobisher, prey to the demon of the game, not only loses large sums at bridge, but also lets herself be ensnared by a suitor, a profligate and libertine man who reveals to her that her husband Jack is actually a murderer wanted by the police. for killing a man in America long ago. The truth, however, is another and will come out when the detective arrives from the United States on the trail of the wanted man: the real culprit is not the husband, but his suitor. Reconciled with Jack, Althea also promises to stop playing cards.

Cast
Edmund Breese as Jack Frobisher
Claire Whitney as Lady Althea
Walter Hitchcock
Stuart Holmes
Edward José

Preservation
The film is now considered lost.

See also
List of lost films
1937 Fox vault fire

References

External links

1914 drama films
Fox Film films
Silent American drama films
1914 films
American silent feature films
American black-and-white films
Lost American films
American films based on plays
1914 lost films
Lost drama films
1910s American films
1910s English-language films